Pseudupeneus prayensis, the West African goatfish,  is a species of goatfish, a marine ray-finned fish from the family Mullidae. This fish grows to 55 cm maximal length. The species name "prayensis" refers to the city Praia, the capital of Cape Verde, the species was described with a type locality of "Port Praya, Cape Verde Islands".

Description
Pseudupenus prayensis has a moderately compressed body with a head profile which is not markedly convex. It has a single spine on the rear margin of the gill cover and a pair of thick barbels below its chin. Both jaws are equipped with strong, conical teeth with a few of the outer teeth in the upper jaw being backward pointing and these are obvious when the mouth is closed. There are no teeth on vomer and palatines. There are 8 spines in the first dorsal fin with the first spine being very short, the second dorsal fin has a single spine and eight soft rays. The body is covered in large scales with a count of 28–29 in the lateral line. It is normally a rosy colour marked with three or four horizontal red lines along its body. The largest fishes may have a standard length of  but they are more normally .

Distribution
Pseudupenus prayensis occurs in the eastern Atlantic Ocean, off the coast of Africa between southern Morocco and Angola, including the Cape Verde Islands. It is  a major targeted commercial species off West Africa and has been recorded on rare, distinct occasions in the Mediterranean Sea since 1987.

Habitat and biology
Pseudupenus prayensis occurs mostly over muddy or sandy sea beds where it feeds on benthic invertebrates. It is common in estuaries.

Usage
Pseudupeneus prayensis is an important species for commercial fisheries along the West African coast. They are mainly taken using trawls, although they are also taken using trammel nets and entangling nets. This species is among the most quarry species for coastal demersal fisheries in Ghana while in Senegal it is an important demersal resource and is caught by both industrial and artisanal fishing fleets.

References

Further reading
 Fenner, Robert M. The Conscientious Marine Aquarist. Neptune City, New Jersey, USA: T.F.H. Publications, 2001.
 Helfman, G., B. Collette and D. Facey: The diversity of fishes. Blackwell Science, Malden, Massachusetts, USA, 1997.
 Hoese, D.F. 1986. A M.M. Smith and P.C. Heemstra (eds.) Smiths' sea fishes. Springer-Verlag, Berlin, Germany
 Maugé, L.A. 1986. A J. Daget, J.-P. Gosse and D.F.E. Thys van den Audenaerde (eds.) Check-list of the freshwater fishes of Africa (CLOFFA). ISNB, Brussels; MRAC, Tervuren, Flanders; and ORSTOM, Paris, France, Vol. 2.
 Moyle, P. and J. Cech.: Fishes: An Introduction to Ichthyology, 4th ed., Upper Saddle River, New Jersey, USA: Prentice-Hall. 2000.
 Nelson, J.: Fishes of the World, 3rd ed.. New York, USA: John Wiley and Sons., 1994
 Wheeler, A.: The World Encyclopedia of Fishes, 2nd ed., London: Macdonald., 1985

External links
Photos of Pseudupeneus prayensis at FishBase

Mullidae
Fish of the Atlantic Ocean
Fish of the Mediterranean Sea
Fish of West Africa
Fauna of Santiago, Cape Verde
Fish described in 1829
Taxa named by Georges Cuvier